Jorge Sánchez García (born in Santiago Tequixquiac, April 8, 1943) is a Mexican syndical leader Luz y Fuerza del Centro and politician from Mexico City.

References

1953 births
Living people
People from Tequixquiac
Politicians from Mexico City
Mexican people of Asturian descent